La Gauloise may refer to:

 La Gauloise de Basse-Terre, a football club in Guadeloupe
 La Gauloise de Trinité, a multi-sport club in Martinique
 La Gauloise de Trinité (football), a football section of La Gauloise de Trinité

See also 
 Gauloise (disambiguation)
 Gaulois (disambiguation)